The Most Wonderful Doll in the World is a 1950 picture book written by Phyllis McGinley and illustrated by Helen Stone. The book is a girl describing to her father the best qualities of a missing doll. The book was a recipient of a 1951 Caldecott Honor for its illustrations.

References

1950 children's books
American picture books
Caldecott Honor-winning works